Núñez de Balboa is a station on Line 5 and Line 9 of the Madrid Metro. It is located in fare Zone A.

The station is named after Spanish explorer Vasco Núñez de Balboa.

References 

Line 5 (Madrid Metro) stations
Line 9 (Madrid Metro) stations
Railway stations in Spain opened in 1970